Pierre Vallon (10 November 1927 – 24 October 2016) was a French businessman and politician. He was an heir to Vallon et Compagnie, a silk company based in La Croix-Rousse, Lyon. He served as a member of the French Senate from 1974 to 1995.

References

1927 births
2016 deaths
Businesspeople from Lyon
French Senators of the Fifth Republic
Politicians from Lyon
Senators of Rhône (department)